This is a list of schools in Taipei, Taiwan.

Domestic high schools
Affiliated Senior High School Of National Taiwan Normal University
 Taipei First Girls' High School
 Sacred Heart Girls High School (Taiwan)
 Taipei Municipal Lishan Senior High School
 Taipei Municipal Neihu Senior High School
 Taipei Municipal Jianguo High School
 Taipei Municipal Zhong-zheng Senior High School
 Tsz-Shiou Senior High School

Bilingual Senior High Schools
 Chingshin Academy
 Taipei Fuhsing Private School
 Taipei WEGO Private Senior High School
 Kuei Shan Bilingual School
 Lih-Jen International Private Elementary and Middle School
 New Taipei City Yuteh Private Bilingual School

Bilingual Junior High Schools
 Taipei Municipal Cheng Zheng Junior High School (International Program)

International high schools
 Taipei American School
 Taipei European School
 Taipei Japanese School
 Kang Chiao International School
 Tamkang Senior High School
 Morrison Academy
 Dominican International School
 Taipei Adventist American School
 Taipei Adventist Preparatory Academy
 Wesley Girls' High School, Taipei
 Grace Christian Academy, Taipei
 Columbia International College, Taiwan (Taoyuan)
 Shin Shing International School (Taoyuan)

Chinese Mandarin Schools
 Taiwan Mandarin Institute

See also 
 List of universities and colleges in Taipei

 
Taipei